Highway 285 (AR 285, Ark. 285, and Hwy. 285) is a designation for three north–south state highways in central Arkansas. One route of  runs north from US Route 65 near Greenbrier to Woolly Hollow State Park in Faulkner County. A second route of  begins at Highway 25 in Wooster and runs north to Highway 124 at Martinville, also in Faulkner County. A third segment runs north from US 65 in Damascus to Highway 92 at Rabbit Ridge in Van Buren County.

Route description

Greenbrier to Woolly Hollow State Park
The route begins north of Greenbrier in Faulkner County at US Route 65 (US 65) near the historic Merritt House listed on the National Register of Historic Places (NRHP). Highway 285 winds east through a sparsely populated area of the county before terminating at Woolly Hollow Road, which serves as the entrance to Woolly Hollow State Park. The roadway continues east as Blythe Road under county maintenance.

Wooster to Martinville
Highway 285 begins in Wooster at Highway 25. The highway winds north to Shady Grove where it serves as the southern terminus for Highway 225. Highway 285 continues north through Bono and Twin Groves before terminating at Highway 124 near Martinville.

Damascus to Rabbit Ridge
Highway 285 begins in southern Van Buren County at US 65 in Damascus. The route runs west past the Damascus Gymnasium and Melvin Chrisco House, both listed on the NRHP, before exiting the corporate limits. Continuing west, the highway turns due north and terminates at Highway 92 at the unincorporated community of Rabbit Ridge. It does not intersect any other state highways along its route.

Major intersections

See also

References

285
Transportation in Van Buren County, Arkansas
Transportation in Faulkner County, Arkansas